Louis Jordan Beyer (born 19 May 2000) is a German professional footballer who plays as a defender for EFL Championship club Burnley, on loan from Borussia Mönchengladbach. He has represented Germany at U16 through U21 youth levels.

Career

Borussia Mönchengladbach

Youth
Beyer started his career at hometown club DJK-SV Thomasstadt Kempen. As a player of the under-13 side he moved to the youth academy of Fortuna Düsseldorf in 2012. For the 2015–16 season, he joined the under-16 team of Borussia Mönchengladbach. In the 2016–17 season he advanced to the under-17s, with whom he played in the Under 17 Bundesliga. For the 2017–18 season, Beyer moved up to the under-19s, for whom he had already made an appearance in the Under 19 Bundesliga in the pre-season.

First team
For the 2018–19 season, Beyer was promoted to the first team under head coach Dieter Hecking. Under Hecking, he made his professional debut in the first round of the DFB-Pokal. In September 2018, Beyer signed his first professional contract, keeping him at the club until June 2022. Over the entire season, Beyer completed nine appearances in the Bundesliga, during which he was in the starting lineup eight times. In addition, he made four appearances for the second team in the fourth-tier Regionalliga West as well as once in the Under 19 Bundesliga.

During the first half of the 2019–20 season, under new head coach Marco Rose, Beyer made three appearances in the Bundesliga; all as a substitute. In addition, he appeared four times for the second team in the Regionalliga.

Loan to Hamburger SV
On 14 January 2020, Beyer joined Hamburger SV on loan in the 2. Bundesliga, reuniting him with Hecking who had become head coach there. Before the season was suspended in March due to the COVID-19 pandemic, Beyer had made seven appearances in the starting lineup. As the season was continued in mid-May, Josha Vagnoman, who Beyer had been brought in to replace due to a long-term injury, returned to the right-back position. This meant that Beyer moved to the centre back position alongside Timo Letschert. Beyer, however, soon lost his starting position to Rick van Drongelen after recording a weak performance, and was benched as a consequence. After that, Beyer only made sporadic appearances for HSV. In total, he played 11 times for HSV, who missed the promotion after ending in 4th place. With his loan deal ending, Beyer returned to Mönchengladbach after the season.

Loan to Burnley
Beyer joined EFL Championship club Burnley on a season-long loan on 1 September 2022. He made his Burney debut on 13 September in a 1–1 away draw at Deepdale to Preston North End, coming on in the 62nd minute in place of injured Charlie Taylor. He made his first start four days later in place of Taylor, forming a centre-back duo with fellow loanee Taylor Harwood-Bellis in Burnley's 2–1 home victory against Bristol City. He scored his first goal for the club in a 1-0 win over Coventry City on 14 January 2023.

Personal life
Beyer was referred to by his first name, Louis, before his move to Borussia Mönchengladbach. As he had Louis Hiepen as a namesake in his team, he was called "Jordan" – his second name – from then on. 

On 25 September 2020, he tested positive for COVID-19.

Career statistics

Notes

References

External links
 
 Profile at kicker.de

2000 births
Living people
Footballers from North Rhine-Westphalia
People from Viersen (district)
Sportspeople from Düsseldorf (region)
Association football defenders
German footballers
Germany youth international footballers
Germany under-21 international footballers
German expatriate footballers
Borussia Mönchengladbach players
Hamburger SV players
Burnley F.C. players
Bundesliga players
2. Bundesliga players
Regionalliga players
Expatriate footballers in England
German expatriate sportspeople in England